María Irigoyen (born 24 June 1987) is an Argentine former tennis player.

On 13 July 2015, she reached her best singles ranking of world No. 147. On 13 June 2016, she peaked at No. 47 in the WTA doubles rankings.

In her career, Irigoyen won two doubles titles on the WTA Tour, as well as 17 singles and 60 doubles titles on the ITF Women's Circuit.

Playing for Argentina Fed Cup team since 2008, she has a win–loss record of 21–18.

WTA career finals

Doubles: 8 (2 titles, 6 runner-ups)

ITF Circuit finals

Singles: 30 (17 titles, 13 runner-ups)

Doubles: 99 (60 titles, 39 runner-ups)

References

External links
 
 
 

1987 births
Argentine female tennis players
Argentine people of Basque descent
Living people
People from Tandil
Sportspeople from Buenos Aires Province
Tennis players at the 2011 Pan American Games
Pan American Games gold medalists for Argentina
Pan American Games bronze medalists for Argentina
Tennis players at the 2015 Pan American Games
Pan American Games medalists in tennis
Medalists at the 2011 Pan American Games
Medalists at the 2015 Pan American Games
21st-century Argentine women